Jorge Ernesto Pardón García (March 4, 1905 - December 19, 1977) was a Peruvian footballer who played for Peru at the 1930 FIFA World Cup. He also played for Sporting Cristal.

References

External links

FIFA profile

1905 births
1977 deaths
People from Arequipa
Association football goalkeepers
Peruvian footballers
Peru international footballers
Circolo Sportivo Italiano footballers
Atlético Chalaco footballers
1930 FIFA World Cup players